Lapsamita is a genus of spiders in the family Salticidae. It was first described in 2013 by Ruiz. , it contains only one Brazilian species, Lapsamita maddisoni.

References

Salticidae
Monotypic Salticidae genera
Spiders of Brazil